Liz Lee may refer to:

 Liz Lee (politician), a state representative from Minnesota
 Liz Lee, a character in the My Life as Liz television series

See also 
Elizabeth Lee (disambiguation)
Lee (name) (disambiguation)
Liz, a given name